Arkan may refer to:
 Arkan, Kerman
 Arkan, North Khorasan